The Daniel Cassidy and Sons General Merchandise Store, on the west side of New Mexico State Road 3 in Cleveland, New Mexico, dates from around 1865.  It was listed on the National Register of Historic Places in 1979.  The listing included two contributing buildings.

It is a cluster of adobe buildings including a  store and a large family dwelling, plus an L-shaped barn, other outbuildings, plus wagon yards and stock corrals.  The business started in c.1863.

References

		
National Register of Historic Places in Mora County, New Mexico
Commercial buildings completed in 1863